Gu Yuan (born May 9, 1982) is a female hammer thrower from PR China. She was born in Yingkou, Liaoning.  Her personal best throw is 72.36 metres, achieved in July 2004 in Padova.

International competitions

References

1982 births
Living people
Athletes from Liaoning
People from Yingkou
Chinese female hammer throwers
Olympic athletes of China
Athletes (track and field) at the 2004 Summer Olympics
Asian Games gold medalists for China
Asian Games silver medalists for China
Asian Games medalists in athletics (track and field)
Athletes (track and field) at the 2002 Asian Games
Athletes (track and field) at the 2006 Asian Games
World Athletics Championships athletes for China
Medalists at the 2002 Asian Games
Medalists at the 2006 Asian Games
Competitors at the 2007 Summer Universiade
20th-century Chinese women
21st-century Chinese women